Andrew "Bongi" Intamba (14 April 1947 – 8 April 2014) was a Namibian politician and diplomat. Intamba served as the country's Director of the Central Intelligence Service from 1991 until 2007. He then joined the Ministry of Foreign Affairs as a diplomat in February 2008. President Hifikepunye Pohamba appointed Intamba as Namibia's first Ambassador to Egypt in 2008, a position he held until his death.

He was awarded the Order of Namibia Eagle 2nd Class medal in 2004.

Intamba died of a short illness at the Rhino Park hospital in Windhoek, Namibia, on 8 April 2014, at the age of 67. He was survived by his wife, Johanna Intamba, four daughters, and a son.

References

1947 births
2014 deaths
Ambassadors of Namibia to Egypt
Namibian diplomats